Aegeirus or Aigeiros was a town of ancient Lesbos.

The site of Aegeirus is tentatively located near modern Kabakli.

References

Populated places in the ancient Aegean islands
Former populated places in Greece
Ancient Lesbos